Kungur is a town in the southeast of Perm Krai, Russia, located in the Ural Mountains at the confluence of the rivers Iren and Shakva with the Sylva (Kama's basin). Population:    64,800 (1959); 36,000 (1939).

History

In 1662, it was burnt by Bashkirs. In 1663, it was rebuilt as a fortress on the place of the village of Mysovskoye. In the beginning of the 18th century, leather and footwear industries started to develop here, and in 1724, a tannery was built. By the mid-18th century, Kungur became one of the most populated areas in the Urals. In 1759, Perm administration of mining plants was moved to Kungur. By the end of the 18th century, Kungur is an important transit trade center of the Siberian road, as well as the center of leather manufacture in Perm Governorate. Kungur rope and linseed oil were widely known. In 1774, the town withstood a siege by Yemelyan Pugachev's Cossack forces. By the end of the 19th century, Kungur had become a significant industrial (including manufacture of leather footwear, gloves, and mittens) and cultural center.

In 1890 the Kungurian Age of the Permian Period of geological time was named for Kungur.

Coat of arms

The town's original coat of arms became official according with the Highest Law  of Empress Anna Ioannovna in 1737. Current coat of arms was adopted in 1994.

Administrative and municipal status
Within the framework of administrative divisions, Kungur serves as the administrative center of Kungursky District, even though it is not  a part of it. As an administrative division, it is incorporated separately as the town of krai significance of Kungur—an administrative unit with the status equal to that of the districts. As a municipal division, the town of krai significance of Kungur is incorporated as Kungur Urban Okrug.

Economy
Major industries are SIA Turbobur and JSK "Kungur-footwear" (leather including army footwear). The town produces art goods (souvenirs from stone, maiolica), musical instrument (guitars) factories, repair-mechanical plant, clothing and knitting mills, and food industry companies. Rye, wheat, oats, barley, potatoes, vegetables are grown in Kungur, and the town also has meat-dairy cattle husbandry and aviculture.

Transportation

Kungur is located at the crossing of the Solikamsk route, the Siberian path, and the Trans-Siberian Highway.

Architecture
Among the notable buildings in Kungur are the Transfiguration Church (1781), Nikola Cathedral, former Guest courtyard with the Burse (1865–76, architect R. O. Karvovsky), the Zyryanov Hospice (1881, now the surgical department of a hospital), the 19th century storehouses of the Kopakov merchants (now a culture center).

The Tikhvinsky Temple was built in 1763 and got its name from the holy icon of Tikhvinskaya Bogomater. Now the movie theater "Oktyabr" is located in the building.

In the lower part of the town, on Kittarskaya street, is the Uspenskaya Church, built in 1761. On the opposite bank of the Sylva river stands the Preobrazhensky Temple.

Tourism and attractions

Kungur Ice Cave

The Kungur Ice Cave is located in the vicinity of Kungur, on the right bank of the Sylva River. Ramified passages stretch under the ground for over 6,000 meters, and only a small part has already been explored. To this day, old slides and crumblings do not allow to determine the total length of the passages. In the explored part of the cave there are several dozens of grottoes; the largest one, which is called the Druzhba (Friendship) Grotto, was given its name in honor of the participants of the International Geological Congress who visited the cave in 1937. Inside this grotto there is a lake with the area of 750 m2. The grottoes are "adorned" with columns of stalagmites and icicles of stalactites up to two meters in height. Over millennia, limestone bearing water has created an infinite variety of forms in the cave, like snowflakes which change in size during the year and reach the size of a maple leaf during late winter. The cave is filled with water from the Sylva River twice a year, in spring and in fall, when it is not accessible to tourists.

Sky Fair and Сity Day

Education
Educational facilities in the town include:
Kungur Lyceum
Kungur College of Woodwork
Kungur Professional Art Lyceum
School of Arts
Kungur Pedagogical College
Kungur Agricultural College
Kungur College of Autotransport

Sister city
 Samcheok, South Korea

References

Notes

Sources

External links
Unofficial website of Kungur
Kungur Ice Cave
Kungur News 

Cities and towns in Perm Krai
Kungursky Uyezd
Populated places established in 1663
1663 establishments in Russia